The 2012–13 Women's FIH Hockey World League Round 1 was held from August to December 2012. A total of 28 teams competing in 6 events took part in this round of the tournament playing for 15 berths in the Round 2, played in February and March 2013.

Qualification
Each national association member of the International Hockey Federation (FIH) had the opportunity to compete in the tournament. Teams ranked 17th and lower in the FIH World Rankings current at the time of seeking entries for the competition were allocated to one of the Round 1 events. The following 28 teams, shown with final pre-tournament rankings, competed in this round of the tournament.

 (28)
 (41)
 (21)
 (14)
 (23)
 (37)
 (59)
 (25)
 (31)
 (58)
 (17)
 (33)
 (34)
 (22)
 (54)
 (61)
 (20)
 (60)
 (19)
 (49)
 (53)
 (29)
 (42)
 (24)
 (50)

 (58)
 (27)

Prague
Prague, Czech Republic, 17–19 August 2012.

Pool
All times are Central European Summer Time (UTC+02:00)

Awards
Best Player:  Chiara Tiddi
Fair Play:

Accra
Accra, Ghana, 7–9 September 2012.

Pool
All times are Greenwich Mean Time (UTC±00:00)

Kuantan
Kuantan, Malaysia, 14–16 September 2012.

Pool
All times are Malaysian Standard Time (UTC+08:00)

Awards
Best Player:  Fazilla Sylvester Silin
Best Goalkeeper:  Cookie Tan Koon Kim
Top Scorer:  Gulnara Imangaliyeva /  Nor Hidayah Bokhari (6 goals)

Vienna
Vienna, Austria, 18–23 September 2012.

Pool
All times are Central European Summer Time (UTC+02:00)

Port of Spain
Port of Spain, Trinidad and Tobago, 11–17 November 2012.

Pool
All times are Atlantic Standard Time (UTC−04:00)

Suva
Suva, Fiji, 8–15 December 2012.

Pool
All times are Fiji Summer Time (UTC+13:00)

References

External links
Official website (Prague)
Official website (Accra)
Official website (Kuantan)
Official website (Vienna)
Official website (Port of Spain)
Official website (Suva)

Round 1